The Dalesbred is a breed of domestic sheep originating in England. Derived from the Swaledale and Scottish Blackface breeds, the Dalesbred is a northern hill breed distributed in the Yorkshire Dales and into Lancashire. The Dalesbred is genetically distinct from the other northern hill breeds, the Herdwick and Rough Fell.

Very similar in appearance to its parent breeds, both rams and ewes have distinctive horns and a white carpet-quality fleece. Scurs are absent in the breed. It can be best distinguished by having a white spot on each side of its black face, with the end of the muzzle becoming grey.  This breed is primarily used for meat and wool production. The legs are free of wool and are mottled black and white. Dalesbred ewes weigh  and rams .

Dalesbred are a hardy breed capable of surviving the harsh conditions of upland terrain. They are generally bred for several generations in this environment, then ewes are sold to lowland farmers for cross breeding to produce mules. Ewes are often crossed with Teeswater rams to produce the Masham which is one of the most famous of British crossbreeds.

Due to the location and small extent of its distribution, this breed was threatened during the foot-and-mouth disease epidemic in 2001. It is still considered at risk due to its distribution.

Ewes have strong mothering characteristics.

References

External links 

Dalesbred Sheep Breeders Association website

Sheep breeds originating in England
Sheep breeds